Tik or TIK may refer to:
Tik (dance), a Greek dance
TIK (band), a Ukrainian folk rock band
Tik (methamphetamine), a drug colloquially known in South Africa as "tik" 
Tiu Keng Leng station, Hong Kong, station code
TiK, a messaging program
Tik-e Siah, a village in Hormozgan Province, Iran
"Tik Tok" (song), by Kesha

See also
Tick (disambiguation)
Tic (disambiguation)